Billy George Searle (born 25 March 1996) is an English rugby union player.  His most common position is fly-half.  Searle has previously played for Wasps, Bristol Bears, Plymouth Albion, Launceston, Worcester Warriors and the Cornwall county side.

Career
Searle started playing junior rugby at Okehampton whilst at school at Okehampton College.  He left Okehampton to start his senior career at nearby Launceston in the fourth division (National League 2 South).  After impressing for Cornwall in their 2015 County Championship win he moved onto third division side Plymouth Albion.  After one season in Plymouth Searle moved up to Premiership side Bristol to join their academy.

On 11 May 2018 Wasps announced Searle would join them that summer. 

On 8 January 2020, Searle signs for Premiership rivals Worcester Warriors from the 2020-21 season. He has since signed a contract extension until the end of the 2022–23 season.

On 5 October 2022 all Worcester players had their contacts terminated due to the liquidation of the company to which they were contracted.

In October 2022, Searle and former Worcester teammate Jamie Shillcock joined Bath on short-term loan.

Rugby union season-by-season playing stats

Club

County

Honours

Bristol
RFU Championship champions: 2017–18 

Cornwall
Tamar Cup winners: 2015
Bill Beaumont Cup winners: 2015

References

External links 
Wasps Rugby
Bristol Rugby
Plymouth Albion RFC
Launceston Rugby Club
Okehampton RFC
Cornwall RFU

1996 births
Living people
Bristol Bears players
English rugby union players
Rugby union players from Exeter
Wasps RFC players
Rugby union fly-halves